Hampyeong Mo clan is one of the Korean clans. Their Bon-gwan is in Hampyeong County, South Jeolla Province. According to the research held in 2015, the number of Hampyeong Mo clan was 20644. Their founder was  who was from Hongnong Commandery (弘農郡; south of present-day Lingbao City, Henan), China. Hampyeong Mo clan worked as minister of civil service affairs (吏部尚書, Hubu Shangshu) and Four-star rank. When Lee Ja-kyum revolted, Hampyeong Mo clan was dispatched to put down the rebellion. Hampyeong Mo clan made achievements during the rebellion. Hampyeong Mo clan was awarded Gongsin, and he was naturalized in Goryeo. After that, ’s son officially began Hampyeong Mo clan, and his descendant made their Bon-gwan, Hampyeong County because he got the class named Pingzhangshi and designated as lord of Hampyeong County.

See also 
 Korean clan names of foreign origin

References

External links 
 

Mo clans of Korea
Korean clan names of Chinese origin